Butyriboletus roseoflavus is a pored mushroom in the genus Butyriboletus found in Asia. It was originally described in 2013 as a species of Boletus, but was transferred the following year to the newly created genus Butyriboletus.

References

External links

roseoflavus
Fungi described in 2013
Fungi of Asia